Bhainsdehi is a city and a  Nagar Parishad in Betul district in the state of Madhya Pradesh, India. Kukru is the second highest point of Mahadeo hills. Bhainsdehi is the originating place of the river Purna. It is predominantly a tribal tehsil. Bhainsdehi is surrounded by the mountain ranges of Satpura.

Scenic Spots 

 Kukru Eco Tourism Center
 Purna River source
 Muktagiri, or Mendhagiri (52 Temples)
 Prachin Shiv Temple
 Dhuni Wale Dadaji Temple
 Shardha Temple
 Sai Temple
 Shyama Mukherjee Park
 Devi Temple
 Bagdara Sports Stadium
 Church
 Atal Bihari Vajpayee Stadium
 Hanuman Temple
 Sheetla Mata Mandir
 Wind Mill Dedpani
 Renuka Mata Temple Dhamangaon
 Government Garden Katol Nursery Bhainsdehi
 Ram Mandir
19.Gupatwada Shiv Temple

Geography
It has an average elevation of 741 metres (2,431 feet). It is bounded by Maharashtra border Khandwa District in the west, Bhimpur and Chicholi tehsil in the north, Aathner tehsil in the east and Maharashtra border in the south.

Demographics
 India census, Bhainsdehi had a population of 15,756. Males constitute 51% of the population and females 49%. Bhainsdehi has an average literacy rate of 70%, higher than the national average of 59.5%; with 56% of the males and 44% of the females literate. 14% of the population is under 6 years of age.

References

Cities and towns in Betul district